Chalanchulan (also Romanized as Chālānchūlān and Chālān Chūlān) is a city in and capital of Silakhor District, in Dorud County, Lorestan Province, Iran. At the 2006 census, its population was 1,094, in 277 families.

References

Towns and villages in Dorud County
Cities in Lorestan Province